Honos or Honor was the Roman god personifying honor.  He was closely associated with Virtus, the goddess of manliness, or bravery, and the two are frequently depicted together.  Honos is typically shown wearing a chaplet of bay leaves, while Virtus is identified by her helmet.

In 234 BC, Quintus Fabius Maximus Verrucosus dedicated a temple to Honos just outside the Porta Capena, one of Rome's principal gates, following his victory over the Ligures.  Twelve years later, after Marcus Claudius Marcellus defeated and slew the Gallic king, Viridomarus, at the Battle of Clastidium, to win the spolia opima, he vowed a temple to Honos and Virtus.  He renewed this vow after capturing Syracuse in 212 BC, during the Second Punic War, and while consul in 208 he attempted to fulfill it by rededicating the existing temple in the name of both gods.  The College of Pontiffs refused to allow this, so Marcellus restored the temple of Honos, and built a second, adjoining shrine to Virtus, making a double temple.  Marcellus was slain in an ambush near Venusia later that year, so the temple was dedicated by his son in 205.  It was richly adorned with treasures that Marcellus had brought from Syracuse, although many of these disappeared over the next two centuries.  The temple was restored by Vespasian, and was still standing in the fourth century AD.

Another temple to Honos and Virtus was built by Gaius Marius during his fifth consulship in 101 BC, using the spoils he had captured from the Cimbri and the Teutones.  The shrine was probably built on the slopes of the Capitoline Hill, and Vitruvius praises the work of its architect, Gaius Mucius.  It was here that the Roman Senate voted to recall Cicero from exile in 57 BC.

References

Bibliography
 Marcus Tullius Cicero, De Divinatione (On Divination), De Natura Deorum (On the Nature of the Gods), De Republica (On the Republic), In Verrem, Pro Sestio, Pro Plancio.
 Marcus Vitruvius Pollio, De Architectura (On Architecture).
 Titus Livius (Livy), History of Rome.
 Valerius Maximus, Factorum ac Dictorum Memorabilium (Memorable Facts and Sayings).
 Gaius Plinius Secundus (Pliny the Elder), Historia Naturalis (Natural History).
 Lucius Mestrius Plutarchus (Plutarch), Lives of the Noble Greeks and Romans.
 Quintus Aurelius Symmachus, Epistulae (Letters).
 Harper's Dictionary of Classical Literature and Antiquities, Harry Thurston Peck, ed. (Second Edition, 1897).
 Samuel Ball Platner & Thomas Ashby, A Topographical Dictionary of Ancient Rome, Oxford University Press (1929).

Justice gods
Roman gods
War gods
Personifications in Roman mythology